Madravati is a character in the Mahabharata, described as the wife of Kuru King Parikshit, the mother of King Janamejaya (who was the grandson of Abhimanyu) and the great-grandson of Arjuna the Pandava prince on the other side.

Madravati was the daughter in law of Abhimanyu (son of Arjuna) and Uttara who was the daughter of King Virata and Sudeshna (sister of Kichaka) when the Pandavas where in exile in Virata's kingdom Arjuna was teaching dancing and singing to Uttara (the princess of Matsya). Later married Abhimanyu and had a son by the name Parikshit who succeeded his grand-uncle Yudishthira (who stood for righteousness and who was the son of dharma the lord of death). After Kurukshetra war Yudhishthira was appointed as king, Bhima as yuvraja and Arjuna was the commander-in-chief. One day when their mother Kunti Gandhari and their uncle Dhritarashtra went to the forest they all died in the forest fire. Then the news reached Pandavas by the help of Narada then Pandavas thought there is no use of living now and they all thought of going to heaven in their human forms. But later, one by one they died and only Yudhishthira was allowed to go back in human form. It started with Draupadi and Bhima was last one to fall upon the onset of Kali Yuga the Pandavas renounced their king after ruling for 36 years and gave back to Parikshit the son of Abhimanyu and grandson of Arjuna (son the lord Indra). 
Madravati is also referred as Iravati in the Bhagavata Purana, who is daughter of king Uttara.

References

Characters in the Mahabharata